Chen Hualan (born March 1969) is a Chinese veterinary virologist best known for researching animal epidemic diseases. She is a member of the World Organisation for Animal Health (OIE) and a member of the Food and Agriculture Organization Corporate Statistical Database (FAOSTAT). She is now a researcher and PhD Supervisor at Harbin Veterinary Research Institute of Chinese Academy of Agricultural Sciences.

She has been listed among the "Ten Scientific Figures of the Year" by Nature in 2013. She won the L'Oréal-UNESCO Awards for Women in Science in 2016, and was elected to the Chinese Academy of Sciences in 2017.

Biography
Chen was born in Jingyuan County, Baiyin, Gansu province in 1969. In 1987, she was admitted to the Department of Veterinary Medicine of Gansu Agricultural University. In 1991, after receiving a bachelor's degree, she continued to major in veterinary pathology in the Department of Veterinary Medicine of Gansu Agricultural University and studied as a graduate student. In 1994, after graduating with a master's degree, she was admitted to the Graduate School of the Chinese Academy of Agricultural Sciences.[13]

In 1997, she obtained a doctorate degree in infectious disease and preventive veterinary medicine, and then worked as an assistant researcher at the Harbin Veterinary Research Institute of the Chinese Academy of Agricultural Sciences.
In 1999, she went to the Influenza Sub-center of the Centers for Disease Control of the United States for post-doctoral work and collaborative research on bird flu.[13]

In 2002, she returned to China and served as a researcher at the Harbin Veterinary Research Institute of the Chinese Academy of Agricultural Sciences, and successively served as the director of the Key Laboratory of Animal Influenza of the Ministry of Agriculture and the director of the National Avian Influenza Reference Laboratory.[13]

On November 9, 2005, she won the 2nd China Young Women Scientist Award. In 2006, she won the China Youth May 4 Medal.[13]

In 2008, she served as the director of the Avian Influenza Reference Laboratory of the World Organization for Animal Health. In 2008, she was awarded the National Science Fund for Distinguished Young Scholars. In 2009, joined the Jiu San Society.[14]

In October 2015, she was awarded the "World Outstanding Female Scientist Achievement Award" by UNESCO-L'Oréal, and is the fifth Chinese to receive this award. In the same year, she was named one of the "Global Highly Cited Scientists" by Thomson Reuters.[14]

In June 2016, she won the National Outstanding Science and Technology Talent Award and the China Outstanding Young Science and Technology Talent Award.[14]

In November 2017, she was elected an academician of the Chinese Academy of Sciences.[14]

In March 2018, she served as a member of the Agricultural and Rural Committee of the 13th National Committee of the Chinese People's Political Consultative Conference.[15]

In November 2018, Vice Chairman (concurrently) of the All-China Women's Federation, a researcher at the Harbin Veterinary Research Institute of the Chinese Academy of Agricultural Sciences, the director of the Key Laboratory of Animal Influenza of the Ministry of Agriculture and Rural Affairs, and an academician of the Chinese Academy of Sciences.[15]

Member of the 12th and 13th National Committee of the Chinese People's Political Consultative Conference.[15]

On the afternoon of November 1, 2018, the 12th Executive Committee of the All-China Women's Federation held its first plenary meeting. Chen Hualan was elected as the vice chairman of the All-China Women's Federation.[15]

Personal life
Chen is married and has a son.

Major achievement
Research Summary

Chen Hualan presided over the National Avian Influenza Reference Laboratory and systematically carried out the epidemiological monitoring and research work of avian influenza in China, and achieved a series of significant progress and creative research results, and initially clarified the molecular genetics, antigenic variation and pathogenicity of the avian influenza virus. The law of evolution provides a comprehensive scientific basis for the early warning and forecasting of the epidemic, prevention and control strategies, the development and use of diagnostic reagents and vaccines. During the prevention and control of avian influenza, the rapid and accurate diagnosis of a large number of samples from all over the country played a key role in the timely and effective control of the epidemic. It has made a significant contribution to the control of the bird flu epidemic.

Leading the National Avian Influenza Reference Laboratory has made a series of significant progress and creative research results in the epidemiology, diagnostic technology, new vaccine development, molecular evolution and molecular pathogenic mechanism of animal influenza, especially avian influenza, and successfully developed H5 The subtype inactivated avian influenza vaccine and the new "avian influenza and Newcastle disease recombinant dual live vaccine" represent the international advanced level and development trend of the avian influenza vaccine development. After the promotion and application, it has greatly improved the prevention and control of poultry in China and the world. The ability of influenza has very important socio-economic and public health significance.[13]

In April 2013, Chen Hualan and her scientific research team discovered that the new H7N9 influenza virus that causes human infection in China is highly homologous to the H7N9 avian influenza virus that existed in the live poultry market during the same period. It is the first internationally from the perspective of etiology. The source of the new H7N9 influenza virus was revealed, which provided an important basis for the scientific prevention and control of H7N9 avian influenza in China. In May, they discovered that the H5N1 virus could indeed reassort with the human influenza virus to obtain the ability to transmit efficiently through the air between mammals, thus having the potential to cause a human pandemic, revealing the H5N1 virus from a new perspective. A real threat to global public health. In July, she and researchers found that the H7N9 virus is not pathogenic to poultry, but after the virus invades the human body and mutates, its pathogenicity and horizontal transmission ability to mammals are significantly enhanced, thus revealing the existence of H7N9 virus. The risk of a pandemic among adults. These results have been published in the English version of "Science Bulletin" and "Science (SCIENCE)" magazine.[13]

On November 20, 2019, the Chinese Academy of Agricultural Sciences released 10 basic scientific research results that can fully represent the frontier research level of my country's agricultural science and technology in 2018 and have made major breakthroughs, including: the rapid development of the H7N9 highly pathogenic avian influenza virus Evolution and its successful prevention and control. The research was led by the team of Academician Chen Hualan from the Harbin Veterinary Research Institute of the Chinese Academy of Agricultural Sciences. Through large-scale monitoring of poultry avian influenza viruses, the H7N9 highly pathogenic avian influenza viruses were systematically studied and successfully developed H5 and H7 bivalents. The avian influenza inactivated vaccine, monitoring results showed that the vaccine effectively blocked the H7N9 virus from spreading in poultry, and it also achieved "immediate results" in blocking human infection with the H7N9 virus.

Project commitment & achievement reward

Since 1994, Chen Hualan has been engaged in basic research and applied research related to avian influenza and swine influenza, and has presided over more than 20 scientific research projects such as national "key research", "863", "973", and the National Natural Science Foundation of China.<be>

<be>

Journal Papers & Patented Inventions
As of 2014, Chen Hualan has published more than 50 SCI papers related to avian influenza research in important international academic journals; he has obtained 6 new veterinary drug certificates for avian influenza vaccines, of which 3 are genetic engineering vaccines; and 7 national invention patents have been obtained<be>

Representative articles
1. Yanbing Li, Liling Liu, Yi Zhang, Zhenhua Duan, Guobin Tian, Xianying Zeng, Jianzhong Shi, Licheng Zhang, Hualan Chen*. New lineage of H5N1 influenza virus detected in wild birds in Qinghai, western China. Emerging Infectious Disease, 2010, in press.

2. Ying Chen, Gongxun Zhong, Guojun Wang, Guohua Deng, Yanbing Li, Jianzhong Shi, Zhuo Zhang, Yuntao Guan, Yongping Jiang, Zhigao Bu, Yoshihiro Kawaoka, Hualan Chen*. Dogs are highly susceptible to H5N1 avian influenza virus. Virology. 2010, 405, 15-19, on-line, June 25.

3. Lihong Tao, Jinying Ge, Xijun Wang, Hongyue Zhai, Tao Hua, Bolin Zhao, Dongni Kong, Chinglai Yang, Hualan Chen*, and Zhigao Bu*. Molecular Basis of Neurovirulence of Flury Rabies Virus Vaccine Strains: Importance of the Polymerase and the Glycoprotein R333Q Mutation. Journal of Virology. 2010, 84 (17), 8926-8936. on-line, June 10

4. Yanbing Li, Jianzhong Shi, Gongxun Zhong, Guohua Deng, Guobin Tian, Jinying Ge, Xianying Zeng, Jiasheng Song, Dongming Zhao, Liling Liu, Yongping Jiang, Yuntao Guan, Zhigao Bu, Hualan Chen*. Continued evolution of H5N1 influenza viruses in wild birds, domestic poultry and humans in China from 2004 to 2009. Journal of Virology. 2010, 84(17), 8389-8379. On-line, June 10.

5. Yujie Tang, Gongxun Zhong, Lianhui Zhu, Xing Liu, Yufei Shan, Huapeng Feng, Zhigao Bu, Hualan Chen*, and Chen Wang. Herc5 Attenuates Influenza A Virus by Catalyzing ISGylation of Viral NS1 Protein. Journal of Immunology, 2010, 184, 5777-5790

6. Bo Wah Leung, Hualan Chen, George G. Brownlee. Correlation between polymerase activity and pathogenicity in two duck H5N1 influenza viruses suggests that the polymerase contributes to pathogenicity. Virology, 2010, 401：96-106.

7. Yuwei Gao, Ying Zhang, Kyoko Shinya, Guohua Deng, Yongping Jiang, Zejun Li, Yutao Guan, Guobin Tian, Yanbing Li, Jianzhong Shi, Liling Liu, Xianying Zeng, Zhigao Bu, Xianzhu Xia, Yoshihiro Kawaoka, Hualan Chen*. Identification of Amino Acids in HA and PB2 Critical for the Transmission of H5N1 Avian Influenza Viruses in a Mammalian Host. PLoS Pathogens, 2009, 5(12): e1000709.

8. Yongping Jiang, Hongbo Zhang, Guojun Wang, Pingjing Zhang, Guobin Tian, Zhigao Bu, and Hualan Chen*. Protective Efficacy of H7 Subtype Avian Influenza DNA Vaccine. Avian Disease, 2010, 54(S1), 294-296.

9. Jinying Ge, Guobin Tian, Xianying Zeng, Yongping Jiang, Hualan Chen and Zhigao Bu*. Generation and Evaluation of a Newcastle Disease Virus-Based H9 Avian Influenza Live Vaccine. Avian Disease, 2010, 54(S1), 290-293.

10. Guobin Tian, Xianying Zeng, Yanbing Li, Jianzhong Shi, Hualan Chen*. Protective Efficacy of the H5 Inactivated Vaccine against Different Highly Pathogenic H5N1 Avian Influenza Viruses Isolated in China and Vietnam. Avian Disease, 2010, 54(S1), 287-289.

11. Neumann G, Chen H, Gao GF, Shu Y, Kawaoka Y. H5N1 influenza viruses: outbreaks and biological properties. Cell Research, 2010, 20(1):51-61

12. Qimeng Tao , Xiurong Wang, Hongmei Bao, Jianan Wu , Lin Shi, Yanbing Li, Chuanling Qiao , Yakovlevich SA, Mikhaylovna PN, Hualan Chen. Detection and differentiation of four poultry diseases using asymmetric reverse transcription polymerase chain reaction in combination with oligonucleotide microarrays. J Vet Diagn Invest. 2009;21(5):623-632

13. Chuantian Xu, Qiyun Zhu, Huanliang Yang, Xiumei Zhang, Chuanling Qiao, Yan Chen, Xiaoguang Xin, Hualan Chen*. Two genotypes of H1N2 influenza viruses appeared among pigs in China. Journal of Clinical Virology. 2009, 46: 192-195.

14. Hualan Chen, Zhigao Bu. Development and application of avian influenza vaccines in China. Current Topics in Microbiology and Immunology. 2009;333:153-62 (Review)

15. Hualan Chen. Avian influenza vaccination: the experience in China. Rev Sci Tech. 2009, 28(1): 267-74 (Review)

16. Jiyong Zhou, Wenbo Sun, Junhua Wang, Junqing Guo, Wei Yin, Nanping Wu, Lanjuan Li, Yan Yan, Ming Liao, Yu Huang, Kaijian Luo, Xuetao Jiang, Hualan Chen. Characterization of the H5N1 Highly Pathogenic Avian Influenza Virus derived from Wild Pikas in China. J Virol. 2009, 83: 8957-8964

17. Hualan Chen. H5N1 avian influenza in China. Sci China C Life Sci. 2009, 52(5):419-27. (Review)

18. Szretter KJ, Gangappa S, Belser JA, Zeng H, Chen H, Matsuoka Y, Sambhara S, Swayne DE, Tumpey TM, Katz JM. Early Control of H5N1 Influenza Virus Replication by the Type I Interferon Response in Mice. J Virol. 2009 83(11): 5825-34

19. Kashiwagi T, Leung BW, Deng T, Chen H, Brownlee GG.. The N-terminal region of the PA subunit of the RNA polymerase of influenza A/HongKong/156/97 (H5N1) influences promoter binding. PLoS ONE. 2009; 4(5):e5473.

20. Shufang Fan, Yuwei Gao, Kyoko Shinya, Chris K-F. Li, Yanbing Li, Jianzhong Shi, Yongping Jiang, Yongbing Suo, Tiegang Tong, Gongxun Zhong, Jiasheng Song, Ying Zhang, Guobin Tian, Yuntao Guan, Xiaoning Xu, Zhigao Bu, Yoshihiro Kawaoka , Hualan Chen. Immunogenicity and protective efficacy of a live attenuated H5N1 vaccine in nonhuman primates. PLoS Pathogens, 2009, 5(5), e1000409

21. Chuanling Qiao, Yongping Jiang, Guobin Tian, Xiurong Wang, Chengjun Li, Xiaoguang Xin, Hualan Chen, Kangzhen Yu. Recombinant Fowlpox Virus Vector-based Vaccine Completely Protects Chickens from H5N1 Avian Influenza Virus. Antiviral Research, 2009, 81(3):234-8

22. Shufang Fan, Guohua Deng, Jiasheng Song, Guobin Tian, Yongbing Suo, Yongping Jiang, Yuntao Guan, Zhigao Bu, Yoshihiro Kawaoka, Hualan Chen. Two amino acid residues in the matrix protein M1 contribute to the virulence difference of H5N1 avian influenza viruses in mice. Virology, 2009, 384: 29-32

23. Murakami S, Horimoto T, Mai le Q, Nidom CA, Chen H, Muramoto Y, Yamada S, Iwasa A, Iwatsuki-Horimoto K, Shimojima M, Iwata A, Kawaoka Y. Growth determinants for H5N1 influenza vaccine seed viruses in MDCK cells. Journal of Virology, 2008, 82: 10502-9

24. Beibei Jia, Jianzhong Shi, Yanbing Li, Kyoko Shinya, Yukiko Muramoto, Xianying Zeng, Guobin Tian, Yoshihiro Kawaoka, Hualan Chen. Pathogenicity of Chinese H5N1 Highly Pathogenic Avian Influenza Viruses in Pigeons. Archives of Virology, 2008, 153: 1821-1826

25. Chengjun Li, Jihui Ping, Bo Jing, Guohua Deng, Yongping Jiang, Yanbing Li, Guobin Tian, Kangzhen Yu, Zhigao Bu, Hualan Chen. H5N1 influenza marker vaccine for serological differentiation between vaccinated and infected chickens. Biochemical and Biophysical Research Communications, 2008, 372(2): 293-7

26. Kiyoko Iwatsuki-Horimoto, Yasuko Hatta, Masato Hatta, Yukiko Muramoto, Hualan Chen, Yoshihiro Kawaoka, Taisuke Horimoto. Limited compatibility between the RNA polymerase components of influenza virus type A and B. Virus Research, 2008, 135(1): 161-5

27. Jihui Ping, Chengjun Li, Guohua Deng, Yongping Jiang, Guobin Tian, Shuxia Zhang, Zhigao Bu and Hualan Chen. Single-amino-acid mutation in the HA alters the recognition of H9N2 influenza virus by a monoclonal antibody. Biochemical and Biophysical Research Communications, 2008, 371(1): 168-371

28. Peirong Jiao, Guobin Tian, Yanbing Li, Guohua Deng, Yongping Jiang, Chang Liu, Weilong Liu, Zhigao Bu, Yoshihiro Kawaoka, Hualan Chen. A single amino acid substitution in the NS1 protein changes the pathogenicity of H5N1 avian influenza viruses in mice. Journal of Virology, 2008, 82 (3): 1146–1154.

Comment in Journal of Virology: Single-Amino-Acid Substitution Changes the Virulence of H5N1 Influenza Viruses. Journal of Virology, 2008, 82 (3): 1065

Comment in Microbe: Single-Amino-Acid Substitution Changes the Virulence of H5N1 Influenza Viruses.

29. Qiyun Zhu, Huangliang Yang, Weiye Chen, Wenyan Cao, Gongxun Zhong, Peirong Jiao, Guohua Deng, Kangzhen Yu, Chinglai Yang, Zhigao Bu, Yoshihiro Kawaoka, Hualan Chen. A naturally occurring deletion in its NS gene contributes to attenuation of an H5N1 swine influenza virus in chickens. Journal of Virology, 2008, 82 (1):220–228.

30. Hualan Chen, Rick Bright, Kanta Subbarao, Catherine Smith, Nancy Cox, Jacqueline M. Katz, and Yumiko Matsuoka. Polygenic virulence factors involved in pathogenesis of 1997 Hong Kong H5N1 influenza viruses in mice. Virus Research, 2007, 128(1-2):159-63.

31. Yongping Jiang, Kangzhen Yu, Hongbo Zhang, Pingjing Zhang, Chenjun Li, Guobin Tian, Yanbing Li, Xijun Wang, Zhigao Bu, Hualan Chen. Enhanced protective efficacy of H5 subtype avian influenza DNA vaccine with codon optimized HA gene in a pCAGG plasmid vector. Antiviral Research, 2007, 75: 234-241.

32. Jinying Ge, Guohua Deng, Zhiyuan Wen, Guobing Tian, Yong Wang, Jianzhong Shi, Xijun Wang, Yanbing Li, Sen Hu, Yongping Jiang, Chinglai Yang, Kangzhen Yu, Zhigao Bu, Hualan Chen. Newcastle disease virus-based live attenuated vaccine completely protects chickens and mice from lethal challenge of homologous and heterologous H5N1 avian influenza viruses. Journal of Virology, 2007, 81, 150－158.

33. Chuanling Qiao, Guobin Tian, Yongping Jiang, Yanbing Li, Jianzhong Shi, Kangzhen Yu, Hualan Chen. Vaccines Developed for H5 Highly Pathogenic Avian Influenza in China. Ann. N.Y. Acad. Sci. 2006, 1081: 182–192

34. Zejun Li, Yongping Jiang, Peirong Jiao, Aiqin Wang, Fengju Zhao, Guobin Tian, Xijun Wang, Kangzhen Yu, Zhigao Bu and Hualan Chen. The NS1 Gene Contributes to the Virulence of H5N1 Avian Influenza Viruses. Journal of Virology, 2006, 80：11115-11123.

35. Taronna R. Maines, Li-Mei Chen, Yumiko Matsuoka, Hualan Chen, Thomas Rowe, Juan Ortin, Ana Falco’n, Nguyen Tran Hien, Le Quynh Mai, Endang R. Sedyaningsih, Syahrial Harun, Terrence M. Tumpey, Ruben O. Donis, Nancy J. Cox, Kanta Subbarao, and Jacqueline M. Katz. Lack of transmission of H5N1 avian–human reassortant influenza viruses in a ferret model. Proc. Natl. Acad. Sci. USA, 2006, 103(32): 12121-12126

36. Hualan Chen, Yanbing Li, Zejun Li, Jianzhong Shi, Kyoko Shinya, Guohua Deng, Qiaoling Qi, Guobin Tian, Shufang Fan, Haidan Zhao, Yingxiang Sun, Yoshihiro Kawaoka. Properties and dissemination of H5N1 viruses isolated during an influenza outbreak in migratory waterfowl in western China. Journal of Virology, 2006, 80(12):5976-83.

37. Yanbing Li, Chengjun Li, Liling Liu, Hongwei Wang, Chuanbin Wang, Guobing Tian, Robert. G. Webster, Kangzhen Yu, Hualan Chen. Characterization of an avian influenza virus of subtype H7N2 isolated from chickens in northern China. Virus Genes, 2006, 33:117-122

38. Yanbing Li, Zhixiong Lin, Jianzhong Shi, Qiaoling Qi, Guohua Deng, Zejun Li, Xiurong Wang, Guobin Tian, Hualan Chen. Detection of Hong Kong 97-like H5N1 influenza viruses from eggs of Vietnamese waterfowl. Archives of Virology. 2006, 151: 1615-1624

39. Yu H, Shu Y, Hu S, Zhang H, Gao Z, Chen H, Dong J, Xu C, Zhang Y, Xiang N, Wang M, Guo Y, Cox N, Lim W, Li D, Wang Y, Yang W. The first confirmed human case of avian influenza A (H5N1) in Chinese mainland. Lancet. 2006, 7: 367(9504):84.

40. Zejun Li, Hualan Chen, Peirong Jiao, Guohua Deng, Guobin Tian, Yanbing Li, Erich Hoffmann, Robert G. Webster, Yumiko Matsuoka, Kangzhen Yu. Molecular basis associated with replication of duck H5N1 influenza viruses in a mammalian mouse model. Journal of Virology, 2005, 79: 12058–12064

41. Guobin Tian, Suhua Zhang, Yanbing Li, Zhigao Bu, Peihong Liu, Jinping Zhou, Chengjun Li, Jianzhong Shi, Kangzhen Yu, Hualan Chen. Protective efficacy in chickens, geese and ducks of an H5N1 inactivated vaccine developed by reverse genetics. Virology, 2005, 341: 153 – 162

42. Chengjun Li, Kangzhen Yu, Guobin Tian, Dandan Yu, Liling Liu, Bo Jing, Jihui Ping, and Hualan Chen. Evolution of H9N2 influenza viruses from domestic poultry in Chinese mainland. Virology, 2005, 340: 70 – 83

43. K. M. Sturm-Ramirez, D. J. Hulse-Post, E. A. Govorkova, J. Humberd, P. Seiler, P. Puthavathana, C. Buranathai, T. D. Nguyen, A. Chaisingh, H. T. Long, T. S. P. Naipospos, H. Chen, T. M. Ellis, Y. Guan, J. S. M. Peiris, and R. G. Webster. Are Ducks Contributing to the Endemicity of Highly Pathogenic H5N1 Influenza Virus in Asia. Journal of Virology, 2005, 79(17): 11269-11279

44. D. J. Hulse-Post, K. M. Sturm-Ramirez, J. Humberd, P. Seiler, E. A. Govorkova, S. Krauss, C. Scholtissek, P. Puthavathana, C. Buranathai, T. D. Nguyen, H. T. Long, T. S. P. Naipospos, H. Chen, T. M. Ellis, Y. Guan, J. S. M. Peiris and R. G. Webster. Role of domestic ducks in the propagation and biological evolution of highly pathogenic H5N1 influenza viruses in Asia. Proc. Natl. Acad. Sci. USA, 2005, 102: 10682-10687

45. H. Chen，G. Deng，Z. Li，G. Tian，Y. Li，P. Jiao, L. Zhang, Z. Liu, R. G. Webster, K. Yu. The evolution of H5N1 influenza viruses in ducks in Southern China. Proc. Natl. Acad. Sci. USA, 2004, 101(28): 10452-10457

Comments in Nature: Increasing virulence of bird flu threatens mammals. Nature, 2004, 431, July 1, 4.

46. Hualan Chen, Yumiko Matsuoka, David Swayne, Qi Chen, Nancy Cox, Brain R. Murphy and Kanta Subbarao. Generation and Characterization of an H9N2 Cold-Adapted Reassortant as a Vaccine Candidate, Avian Diseases 2003, 47, 1127-1130
47. Yumiko Matsuoka, Hualan Chen, David Swayne, Safety Evaluation in Chickens of Candidate Human Vaccines against Potential Pandemic Strains of Influenza Avian Diseases, 2003, 47, 926-930

48. Hualan Chen, Yumiko Matsuoka, David Swayne, Qi Chen, Nancy Cox, Brain R. Murphy and Kanta Subbarao. Generation and characterization of a cold-adapted influenza A H9N2 reassortant as a live pandemic influenza vaccine candidate. Vaccine, 2003, 21(27-28): 4430-4436

49. Hualan Chen, Kanta Subbarao, David Swayne, Qi Chen, Xiuhua Lu, Jacqueline Katz, Nancy Cox and Yumiko Matsuoka, Generation and evaluation of a high-growth reassortant H9N2 influenza A virus as a pandemic vaccine candidate. Vaccine 2003, 21(17): 1974-1979

50. Kanta Subbarao, Hualan Chen, David Swayne, Louise Mingay, Ervin Fodor, George Brownlee, Xiyan Xu, Xiuhua Lu, Jacqueline Katz, Nancy Cox and Yumiko Matsuoka. Evaluation of a genetically modified reassortant H5N1 influenza A virus vaccine candidate generated by plasmid-based reverse genetics. Virology, 2003, 1.Jan 5, 305(1): 192-200

Awards
  First Class National Science and Technology Progress Award
 Second Class National Technology Invention Award
 Chinese Agricultural Elites Award
 China Youth Science and Technology Award
 China Young Female Scientists Award (2011)
 National "May 1" Labor Medal
 China Youth "May 4" Medal
 L'Oréal-UNESCO Awards for Women in Science

References

1969 births
Living people
21st-century women scientists
Biologists from Gansu
Chinese virologists
Gansu Agricultural University alumni
L'Oréal-UNESCO Awards for Women in Science laureates
Members of the Chinese Academy of Sciences
People from Baiyin
All-China Women's Federation people